The 2021–22 CEV Women's Challenge Cup was the 41st edition of the European Challenge Cup volleyball club tournament, the former "CEV Cup".

Format
The tournament is played on a knockout format, with 32 teams participating. Initially 24 teams play a qualification round with the 12 winners advancing to the main phase. On 29 June 2018, a drawing of lots in Luxembourg City, Luxembourg, determined the team's pairing for each match. Each team plays a home and an away match with result points awarded for each leg (3 points for 3–0 or 3–1 wins, 2 points for 3–2 win, 1 point for 2–3 loss). After two legs, the team with the most result points advances to the next round. The Golden Set winner is the team that first obtains 15 points, provided that the points difference between the two teams is at least 2 points (thus, the Golden Set is similar to a tiebreak set in a normal match).

Participating teams

The number of participants on the basis of ranking list for European Cup Competitions:

Bracket
_

Qualification phase

2nd round
|}

First leg

|}

Second leg

|}

Main phase

16th finals
|}

First leg

|}

Second leg

|}

8th finals

|}

First leg

|}

Second leg

|}

4th finals

|}

First leg

|}

Second leg

|}

Final phase

Semifinals
|}

First leg

|}

Second leg

|}

Finals

|}

First leg

|}

Second leg

|}

References

External links
 2022 CEV Volleyball Challenge Cup - Women

CEV Women's Challenge Cup
CEV Women's Challenge Cup
CEV Women's Challenge Cup